Dactyloscopus comptus is a species of sand stargazer native to the coastal waters of the Bahamas and possibly Puerto Rico and the Virgin Islands.  It can reach a maximum length of  SL.

References

comptus
Fish described in 1982
Taxa named by Charles Eric Dawson